Francisco Galindo (21 November 1920 – before 2001) was a Mexican basketball player. He competed in the men's tournament at the 1948 Summer Olympics. Galindo was later the mayor of Gómez Palacio, Durango, and the hospital in Torreón was renamed in his honour.

References

External links
 

1920 births
Year of death missing
Mexican men's basketball players
Olympic basketball players of Mexico
Basketball players at the 1948 Summer Olympics
Place of birth missing